Orakabeza (or Aracabessa in some United States sources), was launched in 1785 at Hull as a West Indiaman. A French privateer captured and burnt her in a notable incident that violated the neutrality of the United States.

Career
Orakabeza first appeared Lloyd's Register (LR) in 1786. It gave the name of her master as C.Burton, that of her owner as Burton, Senior, and her trade as Hull, changing to London–Jamaica.

Fate
Captain Jonathon Storey loaded Oracabissa with sugar and rum at Jamaica and in early October sailed for England. Oracabissa ran into a gale that damaged her masts and caused a leak. She arrived at Charleston around 9 October and crossed the bar on 16 October.

On 17 October 1797 a French privateer believed to be Vortitude (or Vertitude or Fortitude), commanded by a Captain Jourdain and belonging to Cape Francois, captured and burnt Oracabessa within the bar of Charleston Harbour, in violation of the United States's neutrality. Governor Charles Pinckney forwarded to President John Adams affidavits about the incident. Pinckney stated that he had dispatched the cutter  to the scene, but that by the time she arrived Oracabessa had burnt and the privateer had fled.

Lloyd's List (LL) reported on 15 December 1797 that a French privateer had burnt Orracabeza, Storey, master, off Charleston. Orracabeza had been sailing from Jamaica to London.

Citations

References
 United States Congress (1851) Annals of the Congress of the United States. (Gales and Seaton).
 

1785 ships
Age of Sail merchant ships of England
Captured ships